Sk8 or SK8 may refer to:

SK8 (programming language), multimedia authoring software
SK8-TV, a TV series that aired on Nickelodeon in 1990
Sk8 (TV series), a TV series that aired on NBC from 2001–02
SK8 the Infinity, an anime television series that aired in early 2021
Shorthand for skate
Skate (rapper), an American rapper also known as Sk8